Voronino is a rural locality (a settlement) in Vysokovskoye Rural Settlement, Ust-Kubinsky District, Vologda Oblast, Russia. The population was 10 as of 2002.

Geography 
Voronino is located 9 km northeast of Ustye (the district's administrative centre) by road. Maloye Voronino is the nearest rural locality.

References 

Rural localities in Ust-Kubinsky District